Irene Ng Phek Hoong (born 24 December 1963) is a former Malaysian-born Singaporean politician who represented Tampines Group Representation Constituency from 2001 to 2015. She is also a Writer-in-Residence at the Institute of Southeast Asian Studies (ISEAS).

Education
From 1969–1979, Ng studied at Primary Convent Primary and Convent Secondary in Bukit Mertajam, Penang. She attended Nanyang Junior College, Singapore for two years and then did her Bachelor of Arts & Social Science at the National University of Singapore, obtaining her degree in 1986.

She obtained her M.Sc in International Relations at the London School of Economics & Political Science in 1998.

Career
In 1986, Ng was the editor of Kyoto Publication and later joined the Straits Times Press as a journalist.

Political career
Before joining politics in 2001, Ng was the Senior Political Correspondent of The Straits Times. Irene has won several journalism and writing awards. After joining politics, she worked as Director of Programmes and Senior Research Fellow at the Singapore Institute of International Affairs, and later, as a Director at National Trades Union Congress.

In the 2001 and 2006 general elections, Ng's party, the People's Action Party, were up against the Singapore Democratic Alliance over Tampines GRC. On both occasions, her team won with 73.34% and 68.51% of the votes respectively. At the 2011 general election, she was re-elected with 57.22% of the votes against the National Solidarity Party.

Ng is currently writing the second volume of the biography on S. Rajaratnam, Singapore's first Foreign Minister. The first volume, The Singapore Lion: A Biography of S. Rajaratnam, was published in early 2010. It recently won the Excellence Award for the ‘Best Book/Best Writer’ on Asian socio-economic or media scene’ at the prestigious Asian Publishing Awards 2010. On 11 August 2011, she produced another book, The Short Stories and Radio Plays of S. Rajaratnam, which she edited with an introduction. It was launched by President SR Nathan. The collection is now used as text in the National Arts Council’s Literary Arts Programme's Literart Arts Programme for schools. A telemovie titled +65 based on the book was aired on MediaCorp Channel 5 in March 2013.

Irene is in the Government Parliamentary Committees (GPC) of Foreign Affairs and Defence, Education, as well as of Information and the Arts.

She is a strong champion of promoting multiracialism, holistic education and the arts. A firm believer in social justice, she is involved in unions representing low-wage workers and has been their vocal champion in Parliament. She is Advisor and Trustee of the Amalgamated Union of Public Daily-Rated Workers.

She is also a long-time advocate of safe cycling and a prominent voice in Parliament on making Singapore a more cycling-friendly city. She was instrumental in effecting legislative changes that made it possible for Tampines GRC to be officially designated Singapore’s first model cycling town. She is the Patron of the Singapore Cycling Federation.

A member of both the Advisory Board and Council of National Youth Achievement Award (NYAA), she also plays a key role in engaging women and youth.

She graduated from the National University of Singapore with a Bachelor of Arts and Social Science, studying sociology, English language and philosophy. She has a Master of Science in International Relations from the London School of Economics and Political Science. In 2006, Irene was awarded an Honorary Professorial Fellowship at the Edinburgh University. She served as a faculty member of the Salzburg Global Seminar 2012. Later that year, she was a Visiting Senior Fellow at East–West Center, Hawaii.

Personal life
Ng was married in her mid-twenties but got an annulment, and subsequently married Graham Berry, the chief executive of the Scottish Arts Council in 2007.

References

Singaporean people of Cantonese descent
1963 births
Living people
Members of the Parliament of Singapore
People's Action Party politicians
Nanyang Junior College alumni
National University of Singapore alumni
Alumni of the London School of Economics
Malaysian emigrants to Singapore
Singaporean women in politics
Singaporean Christians
People who lost Malaysian citizenship
Naturalised citizens of Singapore